Robert Jacques (born 11 September 1947) is a French former professional football player and manager.

After football 
Jacques was the chief executive of ES Municipaux Troyes from 1985 to 2009.

References

External links 
 

1947 births
Living people
Sportspeople from Meurthe-et-Moselle
French footballers
French football managers
Association football defenders
Stade de Reims players
Red Star F.C. players
Jura Dolois Football players
Ligue 1 players
Ligue 2 players
French Division 3 (1971–1993) players
Jura Dolois Football managers
Association football player-managers
French football chairmen and investors
Footballers from Grand Est